The cluster CL0024+17 is a cluster of galaxies located in Pisces, and about 4 billion light years distant.  

Cl 0024+17 is allowing astronomers to probe the distribution of dark matter in space. The blue streaks near the center of the image are the smeared images of very distant galaxies that are not part of the cluster. The distant galaxies appear distorted because their light is being bent and magnified by the powerful gravity of Cl 0024+17, an effect called gravitational lensing.

Because dark matter does not shine or reflect light, it cannot be seen. Astronomers can only detect its influence by how its gravity affects light. By mapping the distorted light created by gravitational lensing, astronomers can trace how dark matter is distributed in the cluster. While mapping the dark matter, astronomers found a dark-matter ring near the cluster's center (although this is disputed by other independent studies). The ring's discovery is among the strongest evidence that dark matter exists.

References

External links
 HubbleSite NewsCenter: Hubble pictures of CL0024+17 group
 Press release and more images and video presentations of CL0024+17 at Spacetelescope.org

Pisces (constellation)
Galaxy clusters